Tepeticpac was one of the four altepetl (polities) that made up the confederation of Tlaxcala in pre-Columbian Mexico.  It was the northwest-most altepetl, located west of the Atzompa river and north of Quiahuiztlan. 

The site is in the present day state of Tlaxcala in central Mexico.

References
Muñoz Camargo, Diego (1892 (1585)) Historia de Tlaxcala, published and annotated by Alfredo Chavero, Mexico.

External links 

Altepetl
Archaeological sites in Tlaxcala
Mesoamerican sites